The Oxford Murders may refer to:

The Oxford Murders (novel), novel by the Argentine author Guillermo Martínez
The Oxford Murders (film), 2008 thriller film adapted from Guillermo Martínez's novel, directed by Álex de la Iglesia